In differential geometry, a Sasakian manifold (named after Shigeo Sasaki) is a contact manifold  equipped with a special kind of Riemannian metric , called a Sasakian metric.

Definition
A Sasakian metric is defined using the construction of the Riemannian cone. Given a Riemannian manifold , its Riemannian cone is the product

equipped with the cone metric

A manifold  equipped with a 1-form 
is contact if and only if the 2-form

on its cone is symplectic (this is one of the possible
definitions of a contact structure). A contact Riemannian manifold is Sasakian, if its Riemannian cone with the cone metric is a Kähler manifold with
Kähler form

Examples
As an example consider

where the right hand side is a natural Kähler manifold and read as the cone over the sphere (endowed with embedded metric).

and the Riemannian metric

As a third example consider:

where the right hand side has a natural Kähler structure, and the group  acts by reflection at the origin.

History

Sasakian manifolds were introduced in 1960 by the Japanese geometer Shigeo Sasaki.  There was not much activity in this field after the mid-1970s, until the advent of String theory. Since then Sasakian manifolds have gained prominence in physics and algebraic geometry, mostly due to a string of papers by Charles P. Boyer and Krzysztof Galicki and their co-authors.

The Reeb vector field
The homothetic vector field on the cone over a Sasakian manifold is defined to be

As the cone is by definition Kähler, there exists a complex structure J.  The Reeb vector field on the Sasaskian manifold is defined to be

It is nowhere vanishing. It commutes with all holomorphic Killing vectors on the cone and in particular with all isometries of the Sasakian manifold.  If the orbits of the vector field close then the space of orbits is a Kähler orbifold.  The Reeb vector field at the Sasakian manifold at unit radius is a unit vector field and tangential to the embedding.

Sasaki–Einstein manifolds
A Sasakian manifold  is a manifold whose  Riemannian cone is Kähler.  If, in addition, this cone is Ricci-flat,  is called Sasaki–Einstein; if it is hyperkähler,  is called 3-Sasakian. Any 3-Sasakian manifold is both an Einstein manifold and a spin manifold.

If M is positive-scalar-curvature Kahler–Einstein manifold, then, by an observation of Shoshichi Kobayashi, the  circle bundle S in its canonical line bundle admits a Sasaki–Einstein metric, in a manner that makes the projection from S to M into a Riemannian submersion. (For example, it follows that 
there exist Sasaki–Einstein metrics on suitable circle bundles over the 3rd through 8th del Pezzo surfaces.) While this Riemannian submersion construction provides a correct local picture of any Sasaki–Einstein manifold, 
the global structure of such manifolds can be more complicated. For example, one can more generally
construct Sasaki–Einstein manifolds by starting from a Kahler–Einstein orbifold M. Using this observation, Boyer, Galicki, and János Kollár constructed infinitely many homeotypes of Sasaki-Einstein 5-manifolds. 
The same construction shows that the moduli space of Einstein metrics on the 5-sphere has  at least several  hundred connected components.

Notes

References
 Shigeo Sasaki, "On differentiable manifolds with certain structures which are closely related to almost contact structure",  Tohoku Math. J. 2 (1960), 459-476.
 Charles P. Boyer, Krzysztof Galicki, Sasakian geometry
 Charles P. Boyer, Krzysztof Galicki, "3-Sasakian Manifolds",  Surveys Diff. Geom. 7 (1999) 123-184
 Dario Martelli, James Sparks and Shing-Tung Yau, "Sasaki-Einstein Manifolds and Volume Minimization", ArXiv hep-th/0603021

External links
EoM page, Sasakian manifold

Riemannian geometry
Symplectic geometry
Structures on manifolds